The Tsuruga Port is now one of the three main ports on the Sea of Japan.

History 
Since the early 9th century, Tsuruga port has been involved in Japan maritime trade.

Tsuruga Port has been prospering as a trade gateway between Japan and the Asian Continent since the Nara era, and as transit base for Kitamaebune intra-Japan ships since the middle of Edo era.

In the Meiji era, shipping routes between Tsuruga, Korea, and, respectively Eastern Russia (Vladivostok) were opened, and in 1912, a railway connecting Tokyo with the port of Tsuruga was completed.

Modern development 

Ships of different types, i.e. cargo and passenger ferries, container ships, RoRo (Roll-on/roll-off) ships and dry bulk ships call at Tsuruga port, carrying general merchandises, coal, lumber, cars, buses and trucks…etc.

A three-weekly container service connects Tsuruga and Busan, the largest South Korean port. A bi-weekly Roll-on/roll-off ship service was also introduced with Busan in 2010, and has been in the meantime expanded to a five-weekly service,  thereby providing vital links between these two ports.

Tsuruga Port includes the original "Main Port area", which was the birthplace of the port, and a "New Port area" which has been opened in 2010 in the Mariyama area to serve the expanding freight logistics activities.

A coal-powered power station and cement factory are located immediately North of the New Port area, served by large bulk ships.

Facilities 

Within the New Port complex, there is a public wharf with 12 meters depth of water and 8 meters wide, and a private wharf with 14 meters depth of water and 10 meters wide, and a common ferry wharf for large ferries compatible with facilities at Tomakomai (Hokkaido) port, Akita port and Niigata port.

A multi-purpose International Terminal and a new breakwater have been developed at Mariyama New Port to serve the increasing volume of container cargoes and related freight logistics activities. This multi-purpose International Terminal is designed to meet the logistics needs of The Fukui Prefecture and the adjacent regions of Kansai and Chubu, in relation to both their domestic and foreign trades; it has a deep water depth (14 meters). The adjacent terminal area is of approximately 25 hectares, which makes it the largest on the coast of the Sea of Japan.

Tsuruga Port Multipurpose International Terminal 

Tsuruga Port is serving an important role as a freight transport complex by taking advantage of its geographical characteristics as the nearest port on the Sea of Japan coast to the two major economic Areas of Hanshin, Kansai Region, and Chukyo, Chubu Region.

In order to meet the needs of marine logistics services and enhance the handling of cargo for the greater area of Fukui Prefecture and its environs, the Multi-purpose International Terminal has a deep water quay (14 meters deep) where large 50,000 ton cargo ships can dock and be loaded or unloaded. The adjacent terminal area of approximately 25.4 hectares (currently 17.6 ha) is the largest on the Sea of Japan coast. There are convenient inland transportation links with the port.

Adjacent port grounds of 3.4 hectares are also available to various industrial, trading or logistics businesses. There are plans to link Tsuruga Port by rail with the logistics terminal of Yonehara City, Shiga Prefecture (SILC - Shiga Integrated Logistics Center).

LNG Tankers Terminal project 

In the liquid bulk sector, a Liquefied Natural Gas – LNG – terminal has been envisaged for Tsuruga port for over ten years. This project was again mentioned in March 2013, when the Nikkei Japanese News Agency (Nihon Keizai Shimbun) reported that the Fukui Prefecture, in which Tsuruga is located, will be working with the Japanese national government and in cooperation with three major power utilities, i.e. Kansai Electric Power Co, Hokuriku Electric Power Co and Osaka Gas Co, to build an LNG terminal in Tsuruga to receive LNG tankers (LNG carrier) from various origins (Russia and the USA are mentioned). In connection with this project, Nikkei also reported that the Fukui Prefecture is planning to build a gas fueled thermal power plant and a pipeline to transport the gas, after regasification, to other parts of Western Japan.

Tourist attractions
 Port of Humanity Tsuruga Museum A museum displays the history of Tsuruga Port.
 Tsuruga Red Brick Warehouse A historical monument in the area.  Now used as a restaurant hall as well as diorama display of Tsuruga port during heyday of Tsuruta.

Geography of Fukui Prefecture
Ports and harbors of Japan
Transport in Fukui Prefecture